Hunter Marine  is an American boat builder, now known as Marlow-Hunter, LLC, owned by David E. Marlow.  The company also produces the Mainship powerboat brand.  Marlow also owns and manufactures the  Marlow Yachts brand consisting of long range power cruisers in the 37 to 110 foot range. The company is based in Alachua, Florida.

The first boat design was a 25-foot (7.6 meter) long sloop, and another noted design was the Ocean racing sailboat the HC 50.

History

In the 1800s Henry Luhrs, a German immigrant, outfitted trading ships and owned a chandlery. His grandson, Henry, continued the family heritage on the New Jersey coast, building and repairing recreational and fishing boats.  By the early 1960s Henry and his sons, John and Warren, were building over a thousand powerboats a year.  Hunter was started in 1973 in Alachua, Florida, as a sailboat manufacturer. The early Hunter boats were designed by John E. Cherubini.

In 1988 the company ran into trouble, as the founder, Luhrs, engaged in protected ocean racing and left the company in the hands of management. The result was production of low-quality boats backed by a short warranty and poor customer service, leading to trouble with dealers and unhappy owners. Luhrs was forced to suspend his racing career and return to directly run the company, carrying out a restructuring, creating new work teams, extending the warranty from one year to five years and hiring Canadian designer Rob Mazza in 1991 to take over design and coordinate the production process. Mazza designed the Hunter 29.5 and its larger follow-up, the 336.

Hunter then utilized the design service of Glenn Henderson and its in-house team until 2010.  Hunter is responsible for several market innovations, including their trademark stainless steel cockpit arch and their use of the B&R rig. Hunter also began the construction of sailboats whose hulls make use of bow hollow and stern reflex, marine architecture design elements that maximize thrust under sail.

In 2012 Hunter Marine entered Chapter 11 bankruptcy. The company was sold in August 2012 to David E. Marlow, owner of Marlow Yachts and the name changed to Marlow-Hunter, LLC.

Examples of models made by Marlow-Hunter in the 2010s include the Marlow-Hunter 31, 33, 37 and 40 models. The new 31-foot was developed under Marlow-Hunter under guidance from longtime Hunter marine consultant and naval architect Glenn 
Henderson. The 31 has increased interior space compared to older models, and is actually wider (increased beam) than the 33 foot long boat in the range.

Boats

Hunter boats and year first produced:

Hunter 140  2003
Hunter 146  2003
Hunter 15  2008
Hunter 170  1999
Hunter 18 2011
Hunter 18.5 1987
Hunter 19-1 1981
Hunter 19-2 1993
Hunter 20 1983
Hunter 212 1996
Hunter 216  2003
Hunter 22 1981
Hunter 23 1985
Hunter 23.5 1992
Hunter 240 1998
Hunter 25 1972
Hunter 25 Box Top 1972
Hunter 25-2 2005
Hunter 25.5 1984
Hunter 26 1994
Hunter 26.5 1985
Hunter 260 1997
Hunter 27 1974
Hunter 27 Edge 2006
Hunter 27-2 1989
Hunter 27-3 2006
Hunter 270 2000
Hunter 27X 2006
Hunter 28 1989
Hunter 28.5 1985
Hunter 280 1995
Hunter 29.5 1994
Hunter 290  1999
Hunter 30 1973
Hunter 30-2 1988
Hunter 306 2001
Hunter 30T 1991
Hunter 31 1983
Hunter 31-2 2006
Hunter 310 1997
Hunter 32 Vision 1988
Hunter 320 2000
Hunter 326 2001
Hunter 33 1977
Hunter 33-2004 2004
Hunter 33.5 1987
Hunter 333 1988
Hunter 336 1995
Hunter 34 1983
Hunter 340 1997
Hunter 35 Legend 1986
Hunter 35.5 Legend 1989
Hunter 356 2000
Hunter 36 1980
Hunter 36 Legend 2001
Hunter 36 Vision 1990
Hunter 36-2 2008
Hunter 37 1978
Hunter 37 Legend 1986
Hunter 37.5 Legend 1990
Hunter 376 1996
Hunter 38 2004
Hunter 380 1999
Hunter 386 1999
Hunter 39 2009
Hunter 40 1984
Hunter 40-2 2012
Hunter 40.5 1991
Hunter 41 AC 2004
Hunter 41 DS 2006
Hunter 410 1998
Hunter Passage 42 1989
Hunter 420 1998
Hunter 426 2003
Hunter 43 Legend 1989
Hunter 430 1995
Hunter 45 1985
Hunter 45 CC 2005
Hunter 45 DS 2006
Hunter 45 Legend 1985
Hunter Passage 450 1996
Hunter 456 2003
Hunter 460 1999
Hunter 466 2002
Hunter 49 2007
Hunter 50 AC 2010
Hunter 50 CC 2009
Hunter 54 1980
Hunter E33 2011
Hunter HC 50 2000
Hunter Xcite 2002
JY 15 1989
Marlow-Hunter 15 2003
Marlow-Hunter 18 2011
Marlow-Hunter 22 2010
Marlow-Hunter 31 2015
Marlow-Hunter 33 2011
Marlow-Hunter 37 2014
Marlow-Hunter 39 2009
Marlow-Hunter 40 2012
Marlow-Hunter 42SS 2016
Marlow-Hunter 47 2016
Marlow-Hunter 50 2010
Marlow-Hunter 50 Center Cockpit 2009
Moorings 295 1994
Moorings 335 1988

See also 
 List of sailboat designers and manufacturers

References

Esserman Yacht Sales - Online History of Hunter Marine

External links 

 Official website

Hunter Marine